Guillaume-Antoine Calvière (1695 - 18 April 1755) was a virtuoso  French musician and composer who was for many years organist of the Cathedral of Notre Dame de Paris.

Early years

Guillaume-Antoine Calvière was born in Paris around 1695, the son of Rodolphe Calvière and Jeanne Boundin.
He was a pupil of Philippe Isoré de La Fontaine, who spent his whole career until his death in 1733 as organist of Saint-Denis.
Calvière was gifted and precocious, and made his first public performance at the age of eleven.
Calvière's younger sister Cécile Louise Calvière, born in 1703, was also an organist.

Celebrity

Calvière became organist of Saint-Germain-des-Prés in 1722, and in 1730 succeeded Maderic Corneille as organist at Notre Dame. 
He became a national celebrity, and the Mercure published verses in his praise.
He held the prestigious posts of organist of the Cathedral of Notre-Dame de Paris from 1730 until his death 1755, and of the Royal Chapel from 1738.
Calvière was appointed organist of Sainte-Chapelle in succession to Pierre Février, holding this position from 1739 until his death.
He was also organist at Sainte-Marguerite.
For six months in 1754 he trained Jean-Baptiste Nôtre, who then became organist of the Toul Cathedral for more than half a century.

Work

Calvière was an admirer of François Couperin.  His work included motets and pieces for organ.
His Te Deum mimicked the sounds of wind and thunder.
But apart from a short piece preserved in the library of the Brussels Conservatory, almost nothing has survived.
After his death his widow gave his manuscripts to Louis-Claude Daquin for editing and publication.
Daquin, his friend, colleague and also rival, neglected to do so.
In fairness, Daquin failed to publish many of his own works.

Scores

 IMSLP Pièce en trio for organ.

References
Citations

Sources

French Baroque composers
French male composers
French classical organists
French male organists
1685 births
1755 deaths
17th-century male musicians
Male classical organists